Barbara J. Easterling (born 1933) is an American former labor unionist.

Easterling grew up in Akron, Ohio, becoming a telephone operator at Ohio Bell, and also joining the Communication Workers of America (CWA).  She became a steward of her local, then its secretary and finally its vice-president.

In 1970, Easterling was appointed by John J. Gilligan as secretary of the Ohio Labor Division, in which role she drafted laws to protect women's rights at work, and restrict child labor. She stood down in 1973 to work full-time for the CWA, and in 1980 became assistant to its president, Glenn Watts. She was later elected as an executive vice-president of the union, and in 1992 as its secretary-treasurer.

In 1995, Easterling served as secretary-treasurer of the American Federation of Labor, the first woman to hold the post. However, before the end of the year, she returned to her role at the CWA. She also became president of the World Women's Committee of the Union Network International, and as a member of the Democratic National Committee.

Easterling retired from her union posts in 2008. In 2009, she was elected as president of the Alliance for Retired Americans.

References

1943 births
Living people
American trade union leaders
People from Akron, Ohio